The Federal University of Alfenas (Unifal-MG) is a public institution of undergraduate and postgraduate education situated in Alfenas and having campuses in the cities of Poços de Caldas and Varginha, all in the southern region of the Brazilian state of Minas Gerais.

History 
Originally known as School of Pharmacy and Dentistry of Alfenas (Escola de Farmácia e Odontologia de Alfenas - EFOA), it was founded on April 3, 1914, and transformed into federal university in 2005. The institution has been responsible for the education of numerous generations of notable professionals through its undergraduate and post-graduate courses; for the consolidation of services offered to the local and regional communities; and for the significant growth of its scientific and technological publications, tied to the regional and national development.

Campuses 
The Federal University of Alfenas is a multi-campus institution, having 4 campuses:

 Main Campus - Alfenas 
 Santa Clara Campus - Alfenas
 Poços de Caldas Campus
 Varginha Campus

Undergraduate courses 
Main Campus - Alfenas
 Biology
 Biomedicine
 Biotechnology
 Chemistry
 Dentistry
 History
 Language and Literature (Portuguese/Spanish)
 Mathematics
 Medicine
 Nursing
 Nutrition
 Pedagogy
 Pharmacy
 Physics
 Social Sciences

Santa Clara Campus - Alfenas
 Computer Science
 Geography
 Physical Therapy

Poços de Caldas Campus
 Science and Technology
 Chemical Engineering
 Environmental Engineering
 Mine Engineering

Varginha Campus
 Science and Economics
 Economics
 Public Management
 Actuarial Science

Post-graduate courses 
Biosciences Applied to Health
Environmental Science and Engineering
Material Science and Engineering
Pharmaceutical Sciences
Dental Sciences
Environmental Sciences
Nursing
Applied Statistics and Biometrics
Physics
Public Management and Society
Physiological Sciences
Chemistry
Iberian History
and others.

See also 
 Alfenas

External links 

 

Educational institutions established in 1914
Alfenas
1914 establishments in Brazil
Alfenas